Surendra Raj Acharya is a Nepalese politician, belonging to the Nepali Congress currently serving as the member of the 2nd Federal Parliament of Nepal. In the 2022 Nepalese general election, he won the election from Kapilvastu 2 (constituency).

References

Living people
Nepal MPs 2022–present
Nepali Congress politicians from Lumbini Province
Members of the 2nd Nepalese Constituent Assembly
1958 births